Monochrome photography is photography where each position on an image can record and show a different amount of light, but not a different hue. It includes all forms of black-and-white photography, which produce images containing shades of neutral grey ranging from black to white. Other hues besides grey, such as sepia, cyan, blue, or brown can also be used in monochrome photography. In the contemporary world, monochrome photography is mostly used for artistic purposes and certain technical imaging applications, rather than for visually accurate reproduction of scenes.

Description

Although methods for photographing in color emerged slowly starting in the 1850s, monochrome imagery dominated photography until the mid–twentieth century. From the start, photographic recording processes such as the daguerreotype, the paper negative and the glass collodion negative did not render the color of light (although they were sensitive to some colors more than others). The result was a monochrome image.

Until the 1880s, photographic processes used to print negatives — such as calotype, ambrotype, tintype, salt print and the albumen print — generally produced images with a variety of brown or sepia tones. Later processes moved toward a black-and-white image, although photographers have used toning solutions to convert silver in the image to silver sulphide, imparting a brown or sepia tone. Similarly, selenium toner produces a blue-black or purple image by converting silver into more stable silver selenide. Cyanotypes use iron salts rather than silver salts, producing blue images.

Most modern black-and-white films, called panchromatic films, record the entire visible spectrum. Some films are orthochromatic, recording visible light wavelengths shorter than 590 nanometers, in the blue to green range of the spectrum and are less sensitive to the longer wavelength range (i.e. orange-red) of the visible spectrum.

Modern techniques and uses

Black-and-white photography is considered by some to be more subtle and interpretive, and less realistic than color photography. Monochrome images are not direct renditions of their subjects, but are abstractions from reality, representing colors in shades of grey. In computer terms, this is often called greyscale. Black-and-white photography is considered by some to add a more emotional touch to the subject, compared with the original colored photography.

Monochrome images may be produced in a number of ways. Finding and capturing a scene having only variants of a certain hue, while difficult and uncommon in practice, will result in an image that technically qualifies as a monochrome photo. One can also artificially limit the range of color in a photo to those within a certain hue by using black-and-white film or paper, or by manipulating color images using computer software.

Color images can be converted to black and white on the computer using several methods, including desaturating the existing color RGB image so that no color remains visible (which still allows color channels to be manipulated to alter tones such as darkening a blue sky), or by converting the image to a greyscale version (which eliminates the colors permanently), using software programs like Photoshop. After software conversion to a monochrome image, one or more hues can replace the grey tones to emulate duotones, sepia, selenium or gold toned images or cyanotype, calotype or albumen prints.

Digital black-and-white cameras 
Leica M Monochrom is a digital camera in Leica Camera AG's rangefinder M series, and features a monochrome sensor. The camera was announced in May 2012.

Fujifilm X-Pro1-M is a cheaper option compared to the Leica M Model. It is a digital camera with a removed color sensor to capture monochromatic photographs. The camera was released in March 2012.

Phase One IQ3 100MP Achromatic is a digital medium format camera with an ISO rating exceeding up to 51,200. The camera was released in 2017.

Monochromatic modifiers 
The use of the following modifiers can add a different aesthetic to your images without software manipulation, each used for their own unique purposes:

 Color Filters
 Neutral Density Filters (Gradual or Standard ND Filters)
 Polarizing Filters
 Infrared Filter

Astrophotography applications 
Monochrome imaging for astrophotography is a popular technique among amateur astrophotographers. Modern monochrome cameras dispose of the color bayer matrix that sits in front of the sensor. This allows for specialized narrowband filters to be used, allowing the entire sensor area to be utilized for specific wavelengths of light emitted by many deep space objects. Hydrogen-alpha, a common wavelength used, is red in color. and only the red pixels, approximately 25% of the sensor, will detect this light. In a monochrome camera, the whole sensor can be used to detect this signal. Monochrome photography is also useful in areas of high light pollution.

Image gallery

See also 

Ruh khitch
Black and white
Cyanotype
Ambrotype
Calotype

References

 
Photography by genre